Pharr-San Juan-Alamo (PSJA) Early College High School is a public school in San Juan, Texas (United States). It is part of the Pharr-San Juan-Alamo Independent School District and is one of the district's six high schools. It educates over 2,500 students.

Student demographics
As of the 2007–2008 school year, PSJA High had a total of 2,528 students (98.7% Hispanic, 1.1% White, 0.1% African American, and less than 0.1% Native American). 90.6% of the students are considered economically disadvantaged.

Attendance area and feeder patterns
The school's attendance boundary includes much of San Juan, as well as the PSJAISD section of the census-designated place of Lopezville.

Feeder elementary schools include Arnold Cantu, Carman, Clover, Doedyns, Garza-Pena, Reed Mock, and Sorenson. Feeder middle schools include Austin and R. Yzaguirre.

Accountability rating
Based on the accountability ratings released by the Texas Education Agency on August 2, 2007, PSJA High is currently rated "Academically Acceptable". The school has received a TEA Recognized Campus status as of 2008.

Extra Curriculums
Drill Team 
Baseball
Basketball
Cross Country
Football
Powerlifting
Golf
Soccer
Softball
Tennis
Track
Volleyball
Wrestling
Band 
Theater

 PSJA High School is the only high school in the Rio Grande Valley area to go to the Texas State Championship back to back during the years of 1962 and 1963.

Notable alumni
 Cristela Alonzo
 David Barrera

See also
Pharr-San Juan-Alamo Memorial High School
Pharr-San Juan-Alamo North High School

References

External links
 
 Pharr-San Juan-Alamo ISD

Pharr-San Juan-Alamo Independent School District high schools